Giuseppe "Beppe" Ciardi (1875–1932) was an Italian painter.

Biography
Born  in Venice, he was the son of the painter Guglielmo and the brother of Emma, who also became a notable artist. Beppe Ciardi studied under his father at the Venice Academy of Fine Arts from 1896. He graduated in 1899 and his participation in the Venice Biennale began the same year with the Esposizione Internazionale d’Arte di Venezia, where his work continued to be exhibited in later years and was featured in a solo show in 1912. The author of landscapes characterised by a symbolic interpretation of nature that won the esteem of critics, he was awarded the Fumagalli Prize in Milan (1900), a gold medal in Munich (1901) and a silver medal in San Francisco (1904). His work drew inspiration in later decades from everyday life in Venice and the countryside around Treviso. He died in the family villa at Quinto di Treviso in 1932.

References
 Laura Casone, Beppe Ciardi, online catalogue Artgate by Fondazione Cariplo, 2010, CC BY-SA (source for the first revision of this article).

Other projects

1875 births
1932 deaths
19th-century Italian painters
Italian male painters
20th-century Italian painters
Painters from Venice
Accademia di Belle Arti di Venezia alumni
19th-century Italian male artists
20th-century Italian male artists